Lars Oscar Fonbæk (6 July 1887 – 7 September 1965) was a Norwegian long-distance runner.

He was born in Ullensaker, but represented the club IF Torodd in Oslo. In 1908 he won a bronze medal in the 1500 metres and a silver medal in the 5000 metres. In 1909 he set two unofficial Norwegian records in the 3000 metres and the 1 hour run. He competed in the marathon at the 1912 Summer Olympics, but did not finish the race. His personal best marathon time was 2:44.30 hours, achieved in 1912.

References

External links
 

1887 births
1965 deaths
People from Ullensaker
Norwegian male long-distance runners
Norwegian male marathon runners
Athletes (track and field) at the 1912 Summer Olympics
Olympic athletes of Norway
Sportspeople from Viken (county)